Trichamblytelus ovalipennis is a species of beetle in the family Carabidae, the only species in the genus Trichamblytelus.

References

Psydrinae